The Fairchild FB-3 (Flying Boat number 3) was an all-metal flying boat developed by the new Fairchild Metal Boat Division of the Fairchild Aircraft Corporation. The aircraft did not go into production.

Design and development
The prototype was built at Fairchild's Farmingdale, Long Island facility. The FB-3 was an amphibious high-wing strut-braced monoplane with retractable landing gear, powered by a high pylon-mounted pusher configuration radial engine. The two-step hull provided flotation with two outboard floats for stability. The wings had metal spars and ribs with fabric covering. The interior was well finished for its time.

Operational history
The prototype aircraft (NX7385) was test flown in 1929 but did go into production.

Specifications (Fairchild FB-3)

See also

References

External links

 Photo of FB-3
 Photo of FB-3 Profile
 Photo of FB-3 on Water
 Photo of FB-3

Amphibious aircraft